Boom Bap Project is an American Northwest hip hop group from Portland, Oregon. It consists of Karim, DJ Scene, and Destro, who are also part of the Oldominion collective.

History
Boom Bap Project released the first album, Circumstance Dictates, in 2001. After the release of the album, DJ Tre was replaced by DJ Scene.

In 2005, Boom Bap Project released the album Reprogram on Rhymesayers Entertainment. Most of the album was produced by Jake One and Vitamin D. It featured guest appearances from Gift of Gab and Rakaa, among others.

Discography

Albums
Circumstance Dictates EP (2001)
Reprogram (2005)
The Shakedown (tour only CD released Fall 2006)
Return Flight EP (2021)

Singles
"The Trade" b/w "Writers Guild" (2000)
"The Trade Remix" (2002)
"Get Up, Get Up!" (2003)
"Rock the Spot" b/w "Wyle Out" (2005)

Guest appearances
Chazz Rokk - "As Good As Gone" from Landed on Us (2003)
Static & Nat Ill - "Checkout Time" (2006)
Snowgoons - "The Storm" from Black Snow (2008)

References

External links

Alternative hip hop groups
West Coast hip hop groups